Cardston-Taber-Warner was a provincial electoral district in Alberta, Canada, mandated to return a single member to the Legislative Assembly of Alberta using the first-past-the-post method of voting from 1996 and 2019.

The district was created in the 1996 boundary redistribution when Cardston-Chief Mountain and Taber-Warner were merged. The district comprises most of southern southwest Alberta on the United States-Canada border. It is mostly rural and contains a wide range of topography from Mountains to farmlands, including Waterton Lakes National Park and the Blood Reserve.  Cardston-Taber-Warner and its antecedents have a long history that dates back to the old Cardston riding in the Northwest Territories.

The district has been held by right of center parties since it was created in 1997, and has held the distinction of being one rural riding not continuously held by the Progressive Conservatives in Alberta before many were lost in the 2012 Alberta general election. The Progressive Conservatives elected Ron Hirath and then Broyce Jacobs and the Alberta Alliance captured the district in 2004 holding it for a term before Broyce Jacobs won it back in 2008. The Wildrose Party won the district when Gary Bikman won it in the 2012 Alberta general election, and regained the seat in the  2015 Alberta general election, months after Bikman crossed to the PC Party.

History
The electoral district was created in the 1996 boundary re-distribution from the old ridings of Cardston-Chief Mountain and Taber-Warner.

The 2010 Alberta boundary re-distribution saw only one minor change made to the riding when the Blood Reserve was transferred to the district from Livingstone-Macleod.

The Cardston-Taber-Warner electoral district was dissolved in the 2017 electoral boundary re-distribution, and portions of the district would form the newly created Cardston-Siksika and Taber-Warner electoral districts.

Boundary history

Electoral history

Cardston-Taber-Warner was contested six times in general elections, each time changing its MLA. The first election held in 1997 saw Taber-Warner incumbent Ron Hierath run for his second term in office in the district. He ran against three other candidates taking 60% of the vote to pick up the new district for the Progressive Conservatives.

Hierath retired at dissolution in 2001. He was replaced by Progressive Conservative candidate Broyce Jacobs who the district easily over Alberta First Party leader John Reil who made a strong second place showing in the field of four candidates.

Jacobs stood for a second term in office in the 2004 general election but was defeated in a hotly contested race by Alberta Alliance candidate Paul Hinman. The Senate nominee election district results also favored the Alberta Alliance well with the three Alliance candidates finishing in the top four spots.

Hinman became leader of the Alberta Alliance in 2005. He would lead his party to a merger with the unregistered Wildrose Party headed by party President Link Byfield on January 19, 2008. However Hinman would be defeated by Jacobs in the 2008 election held just weeks after his party merger.

Jacobs would be forced into retirement in the run up to the 2012 election after he lost his party nomination meeting to Pat Shimbashi. The general election saw the Wildrose party reclaim the district with candidate Gary Bikman defeating Shimbashi by a wide margin to earn his first term in office. Bikman subsequently crossed the floor to the PCs in 2014.

Wildrose re-gained the riding in 2015, with Grant Hunter becoming its last MLA. He also crossed the floor, joining the United Conservative Party when the PCs and Wildrose decided to merge in 2017.

Legislature results

1997 general election

2001 general election

2004 general election

2008 general election

2012 general election

2015 general election

Senate nominee results

2004 Senate nominee election district results

Voters had the option of selecting 4 Candidates on the Ballot

2012 Senate nominee election district results

Student Vote

2004 election

On November 19, 2004 a Student Vote was conducted at participating Alberta schools to parallel the 2004 Alberta general election results. The vote was designed to educate students and simulate the electoral process for persons who have not yet reached the legal majority. The vote was conducted in 80 of the 83 provincial electoral districts with students voting for actual election candidates. Schools with a large student body that reside in another electoral district had the option to vote for candidates outside of the electoral district then where they were physically located.

2012 election

See also
List of Alberta provincial electoral districts

References

External links
Elections Alberta
The Legislative Assembly of Alberta
Demographics for Cardston-Taber-Warner

Former provincial electoral districts of Alberta
Cardston
Raymond, Alberta
Taber, Alberta